Chicken Chettinad or Chettinad chicken  is a classic Indian recipe, from the cuisine of Chettinad, Tamil Nadu. It consists of chicken marinated in yogurt, turmeric and a paste of red chillies, kalpasi, coconut, poppy seeds, coriander seeds, cumin seeds, fennel seeds, black pepper, ground nuts, onions, garlic and gingelly oil. It is served hot and garnished with coriander leaves, accompanied with boiled rice or paratha.

See also
List of chicken dishes

References

External links
 Chettinad chicken
 pachakam.com: Chettinad Chicken Curry with dry roasted Coconut

Indian chicken dishes
Tamil cuisine
Curry dishes
Foods featuring butter
Indian curries